Herstmonceux is a village and civil parish in the Wealden District of East Sussex, England, which includes Herstmonceux Castle.

The Herstmonceux Medieval Festival is held annually in August.

History
The name comes from Anglo-Saxon hyrst, "wooded hill", plus the name of the Monceux family who were lords of the manor in the 12th century. In 1086, the manor, simply called Herste, was in the ancient hundred of Foxearle.

In 1677, Thomas Lennard, 1st Earl of Sussex, was paid £3 when he went to a cricket match played at "ye Dicker", a common near Herstmonceux, one of the earliest references to the sport.

The Herstmonceux area is known for the making of trugs, baskets made from split willow boards set in an ash or chestnut frame. A number of local people continue this tradition.

Governance
The parish council consists of eleven elected members. An electoral ward of the same name exists. This ward had a population at the 2011 census of 2,852.

Education is provided at Herstmonceux Church of England Primary School.

Geography

The village (previously called Gardner Street) is part of the larger Herstmonceux civil parish, which includes Cowbeech and the hamlets of Foul Mile, Trolliloes, Cowbeech Hill, Stunts Green, Ginger's Green, Flowers Green and part of Windmill Hill where the Windmill Hill Windmill is situated. Cowbeech village is north-west of the parish.

It is now home to the Bader International Study Centre of Queen's University, Kingston, Canada, and the area therefore enjoys an influx of Canadian and other international students each school year. The castle grounds are also home to the Observatory Science Centre and the Herstmonceux Mediaeval Festival. Buckwell Place was the seat of the Hare family.

There are two Sites of Special Scientific Interest within the parish. Herstmonceux Park is of importance because of its wetland habitat and fen vegetation. It is the only known location of Milk Parsley (Peucedanum palustre) in the south-east. The second site, Pevensey Levels, lies partially in the parish. The site is of biological interest consisting of low-lying grazing meadows, hosting a wide variety of wetland flora and fauna.

Religion

All Saints' (Church of England) parish church, with its 12th-century west tower and 13th/14th century nave, overlooks the Castle. Herstmonceux Congregational Church, just outside the village on the way to the castle, was erected in 1811 and is now a listed building.

Twinning
The village is twinned with Varengeville-sur-Mer, in Normandy, France.

References

External links

 Cowbeech village website

 
Villages in East Sussex
Cricket in Sussex
English cricket in the 14th to 17th centuries
Civil parishes in East Sussex
Wealden District